Nandi Awards (నంది బహుమతులు) for the year 2013 announced by Andhra Pradesh Government on 1 March 2017.

Winners list

References 

Nandi Award winners